Hi-Fi Fo-Fum is an American audio equipment store that began at the dawn of the Hi-Fi era in the mid 20th century. The flagship store was located in Richmond Heights, an inner suburb of St. Louis, Missouri, and was in operation from about 1955 until 2011; another store was opened in Milwaukee, Wisconsin in late 1960, closing in the mid 1970s. The Milwaukee store was located at 26th and Wisconsin; advertisements made word play on the stores' name with the phrase "Hi-fi-fo-fum, twenty-sixth and Wisconsinum."[6]   The name is a variation on fee-fi-fo-fum, with the phrase "hi-fi" interpolated.

The store was founded by Ron Bliffert and the Big Bend store closed shortly after his death. It is noted for carrying a wide variety of high-end audio and video equipment, for installing many custom sound systems in cars, for home installations of home theaters, and for its long-running iconic radio advertisements, known to generations of St. Louisians. At one time, there were five locations, in St. Louis, Milwaukee, and Kansas City.

Hi-fi Fo-Fum was given the award for Best Electronics (retailer) in 2010 by the St. Louis Riverfront Times. Attempts by former manager Tony Dollar to keep the Big Bend store intact after Bliffert's death were unsuccessful, and the retail store was liquidated by Bliffert's daughter.

References
6.http://archive.jsonline.com/news/opinion/the-ghost-of-grand-ave-b99175844z1-238665261.html
Companies based in St. Louis
Consumer electronics retailers in the United States
1960 establishments in Missouri
2011 disestablishments in Missouri